Varegah-e Olya (also Romanized as Vāregah-e ‘Olyā; also known as Sar Cheleh, Sarcheleh Vāregah-e ‘Olyā, Sar Chelleh, and Vāregah) is a village in Cheleh Rural District, in the Central District of Gilan-e Gharb County, Kermanshah Province, Iran. At the 2006 census, its population was 173, in 40 families.

References 

Populated places in Gilan-e Gharb County